The Chicago-Lambeth Quadrilateral, frequently referred to as the Lambeth Quadrilateral or the Lambeth-Chicago Quadrilateral, is a four-point articulation of Anglican identity, often cited as encapsulating the fundamentals of the Anglican Communion's doctrine and as a reference point for ecumenical discussion with other Christian denominations. The four points are:
 The Holy Scriptures, as containing all things necessary to salvation;
 The creeds (specifically, the Apostles' and Nicene Creeds), as the sufficient statement of Christian faith;
 The dominical sacraments of baptism and Holy Communion;
 The historic episcopate, locally adapted.

The quadrilateral had its genesis in an 1870 essay by the American Episcopal priest William Reed Huntington, and was officially adopted by the bishops of the Anglican Communion in 1888. The four elements were held to establish "a basis on which approach may be by God's blessing, made toward Home Reunion", that is, with the Catholic and Eastern Orthodox churches.

American House of Bishops resolution

The four points found their way into a resolution of the House of Bishops of the American Episcopal Church, meeting in Chicago in 1886.  As passed there, the resolution reads as follows:

Lambeth Conference resolution
In 1888, the third Lambeth Conference (an international consultation of bishops of the Anglican Communion) passed Resolution 11. This was a scaled-back version of the resolution passed at Chicago two years earlier, more closely aligned with Huntington's original wording, and reads as follows:

The 1920 Appeal to all Christian People
The 1920 Lambeth Conference picked up and reiterated the points of the earlier documents in fresh language. The rewording of the fourth was radical:

The episcopate was only expressly mentioned in the commentary which followed:

According to Michael Ramsey this conciliatory presentation aroused a great readiness to discuss reunion, but later declarations were more qualified and therefore frustrating for free churchmen.

Significance of the quadrilateral
 
The quadrilateral has had a significant impact on Anglican identity since its passage by the Lambeth Conference. The resolution came at a time of rapid expansion of the Anglican Communion, primarily in the territories of the British Empire. As such, it provided a basis for a shared ethos, one that became increasingly important as colonial churches influenced by British culture and values, evolved into national ones influenced by local norms. At the same time, it has been the locus of fervent debate, especially over its third and fourth points.

The first point, concerning what Anglicans call "the sufficiency of Scripture", takes its language directly from Article VI of the Thirty-Nine Articles, foundational to Anglican scriptural exegesis and hermeneutics since the sixteenth century. As such, it has been widely accepted as written. Similarly, the second point describes the sine qua non of catholic faith since antiquity, and so likewise has enjoyed broad acquiescence.  To the extent that it has been controversial, the controversy has centered entirely on those parts of the Communion that have sought to expand a sufficient statement of faith to include other formulae. The third point has been controversial among some Anglicans as being inappropriately limited. In particular, many  Anglo-Catholics have maintained that the five other sacraments should be included as essential marks of the Church (see Anglican sacraments). By far, the most controversial point has been the fourth, which many believe could open the door to challenging the Church's episcopal tradition of apostolic succession.

The quadrilateral in ecumenical dialogue
The Chicago-Lambeth Quadrilateral has also been important to ecumenical dialogue. In this context, it had been helpful in consultations between the Anglican and Roman Catholic communions and between certain Anglican ecclesiastical provinces and national Lutheran organizations.

Apostolicae curae is the title of a papal bull issued in 1896 by Pope Leo XIII declaring all Anglican ordinations to be "absolutely null and utterly void". It has been described as an early Roman Catholic response to the ecumenical efforts of the Chicago-Lambeth Quadrilateral. This papal bull was in turn responded to by "Saepius officio" written by the then Archbishops of Canterbury and York, Frederick Temple and William Maclagan.

The quadrilateral has also proved a stumbling block, however, as in the discussions between the Anglican Church of Canada and the United Church of Canada, between the Church of England and the Methodist Church of Great Britain, and between the Church of England and other free churches, all of which broke down largely due to the issue of episcopacy.

See also

 Anglican Communion and ecumenism

References

Citations

Sources

Further reading

 
 
 
 
 

Anglican sacraments
Anglican theology and doctrine
Christian statements of faith
Episcopacy in Anglicanism
Anglican Communion